Tanya Petty is a German ten-pin bowler. She finished in 11th position of the combined rankings at the 2006 AMF World Cup.

References

Living people
Year of birth missing (living people)
German ten-pin bowling players
Place of birth missing (living people)
Competitors at the 2001 World Games
World Games silver medalists
World Games medalists in bowling